Helicops yacu, the Peru keelback, is a species of snake in the family Colubridae. It is found in Peru and Brazil.

References 

Helicops]
Snakes of South America
Reptiles of Peru
Reptiles of Brazil
Reptiles described in 1975
Taxa named by Douglas A. Rossman
Taxa named by James R. Dixon